George W. Richardson (died March 12, 1930) was an American politician and lawyer from Maryland. He served as a member of the Maryland House of Delegates, representing Harford County from 1890 to 1892.

Career
Richardson was a Democrat. He served as a member of the Maryland House of Delegates, representing Harford County from 1890 to 1892. He was a candidate for re-election in 1891, but lost.

Richardson worked as a lawyer in Baltimore and Bel Air. Richardson also served as justice of the peace in Bel Air for 41 years.

Personal life
Richardson died on March 12, 1930, at the age of 84 or 85, at his home in Bel Air. He was buried at St. Ignatius Cemetery in Hickory.

References

Year of birth uncertain
1840s births
1930 deaths
People from Bel Air, Maryland
Lawyers from Baltimore
Democratic Party members of the Maryland House of Delegates
American justices of the peace